Marco Sas (born 16 February 1971 is a Dutch retired footballer who played for Sparta Rotterdam, NAC Breda, Bradford City and FC Basel.

Career
Sas advanced from the youth team to Sparta Rotterdam first team in 1988 and stayed with them for three seasons. During this time Sas made four appearances for the Netherlands U21 team. In 1991 he transferred to NAC Breda, where he played for five years. In 1996 Sas moved to England on a free transfer and signed for Bradford City, but after one season he moved on to Switzerland.

Sas joined FC Basel's first team for their 1997–98 season under head coach Jörg Berger. After playing in four test games _ played his domestic league debut for the club in the away game in the Stade Olympique de la Pontaise on 9 July 1997 as Basel were defeated 0–3 by Lausanne-Sport.

Sas was injured in Oktober and due to this he did not play again before the winter break. He made a come back during the test games, but the injury re-occurred. Later Sas left the club and ended his professional career. During his short time with the club Sas played a total of 24 games for Basel. 14 of these games were in the Nationalliga A and 10 were friendly games. He scored one goal during these friendly games.

References

Sources
 Rotblau: Jahrbuch Saison 2017/2018. Publisher: FC Basel Marketing AG. 
 Die ersten 125 Jahre. Publisher: Josef Zindel im Friedrich Reinhardt Verlag, Basel. 
 Verein "Basler Fussballarchiv" Homepage

External links
Marco Sas at Dutch Players Abroad

1971 births
Living people
Dutch footballers
Dutch expatriate footballers
Sparta Rotterdam players
NAC Breda players
Bradford City A.F.C. players
FC Basel players
People from Vlaardingen
Association football central defenders
Footballers from South Holland